The Farman F.430 was a 1930s French light transport designed and built by the Farman Aviation Works. Two variants with different engines were known as the F.431 and F.432.

Design and development
The F.430 was a low-wing cantilever monoplane with a tail-wheel landing gear. It was powered by two wing-mounted de Havilland Gipsy Major piston engines. The enclosed cockpit and cabin had room for a pilot and five passengers. The prototype F-ANBY appeared in 1934 and the F.431 variant with  Renault Bengali-Six inverted piston engines was exhibited at the 1934 Paris Salon de l'Aeronautique. A further variant with  Farman radial engines was designated the F.432.

After the company had been nationalised and became part of SNCAC a variant with a retractable landing gear (designated the  Centre 433) was completed, and flown for the first time in December 1938. The F.430 and two F.431s were used by Air Service between Paris and Biarritz.

Variants
F.430
Prototype with  de Havilland Gipsy Major I inline piston engines, one built.
F.431
Variant with  Renault 6Pdi inverted piston engines, three built.
F.432
Variant with  Farman radial engines or Renault 6Q-06 engines, two built and two converted from F.431s.
Centre 433
Retractable landing gear version of the F.431, powered by  Renault 6Q-06/Renault 6Q-O7 engines (left and right hand rotation), one built.

Operators

Air Service

Spanish Republican Air Force

Specifications (F.431)

See also

References

Citations

Bibliography
 The Illustrated Encyclopedia of Aircraft (Part Work 1982-1985), 1985, Orbis Publishing, Page 1759

External links

1930s French civil utility aircraft
F.0430
SNCAC aircraft
Low-wing aircraft
Aircraft first flown in 1934
Twin piston-engined tractor aircraft